Sir John Sackville (c. 1591–1661) was an English gentleman and landowner who sat in the House of Commons in 1625 and 1626.

Sackville was the son of John Sackville of Selscomb, Sussex. He matriculated at St John's College, Oxford on 21 October 1608 aged 17. In 1625, he was elected member of parliament for Rye. He was re-elected MP for Rye in 1626. He was knighted on 16 April 1628.

One of his sons was Edward Sackville, one of King James II's Major Generals during the Glorious Revolution.

References

1590s births
English MPs 1625
English MPs 1626
1661 deaths